Rozelle is a suburb of Sydney, Australia. It can also refer to:

 Rozelle Bay of Sydney Harbour, Australia
 Rozelle (given name)
 Rozelle (surname)

See also
 Roselle (disambiguation)
 Rozella (disambiguation)